Danny Gibson (born January 28, 1984) is an American professional basketball player, who lastly played for Śląsk Wrocław of the PLK. Gibson plays the point guard or shooting guard and has played in multiple leagues in Europe.

Professional career
On October 17, 2013, Gibson signed with Śląsk Wrocław of the Polish Basketball League. He won the Polish Basketball Cup with Śląsk Wrocław.

On July 14, 2014, Gibson signed with Rosa Radom of the Polish Basketball League.

On August 11, 2015, Gibson signed with Pierniki Toruń of the Polish Basketball League.

On October 29, 2019, he has signed with Śląsk Wrocław of the PLK.

Honours

Club
Śląsk Wrocław
Polish Basketball Cup: 2014
ZZ Leiden
NBB Cup: 2010

Individual
DBL Most Valuable Player (1): 2009–10
All-DBL Team (1):  2009–10
DBL All-Star (1): 2010
All-PLK Team (1): 2015–16

References

External links
Profile at rizemanagement.com
Profile at eurobasket.com

1984 births
Living people
American expatriate basketball people in Bulgaria
American expatriate basketball people in France
American expatriate basketball people in Germany
American expatriate basketball people in Poland
American expatriate basketball people in the Netherlands
American men's basketball players
B.S. Leiden players
Basketball players from Indiana
Büyükçekmece Basketbol players
Cuxhaven BasCats players
Dutch Basketball League players
Giants Nördlingen players
Ikaros B.C. players
Junior college men's basketball players in the United States
Limoges CSP players
Medi Bayreuth players
PBC Academic players
People from Madison, Indiana
Point guards
Rosa Radom players
Śląsk Wrocław basketball players
Southern Indiana Screaming Eagles men's basketball players
Twarde Pierniki Toruń players